This is a list of forts in Wallachia, southern Romania.

Stone citadels

Earthen citadels

Fortified royal courts
 Câmpulung
 Curtea de Argeș
 Târgoviște
 Bucharest

Fortified villages
 Coconi
 Basarabi
 Rușii de Vede

See also
 List of fortified churches in Transylvania
 List of castles in Romania

References
 Gheorghe I. Cantacuzino, Cetăți Medievale din Țara Românească, Editura Științifică și Enciclopedică, 1981

Wallachia
Fortifications
Fortifications